Järva-Madise is a village in Järva County, in Järva Parish, in northern-central Estonia. It was the administrative centre of Albu Parish.

References

 

Villages in Järva County
Kreis Jerwen